Forum Lviv is a shopping centre in Lviv, Ukraine, opened on September 25, 2015.

Description 
Located in central part of the city on Pid Dubom Street. It has three floors with a total retail area 35,000 m² and underground parking for 600 cars. Shopping mall contains a cinema, leisure facilities and restaurants overlooking the city.

In shopping mall representing many Ukrainian and international brands, including a Silpo supermarket and a Comfy electronics supermarket as anchor tenants, Samsung, Planeta Kino cinema, Zara, Bershka, Pull & Bear, Stradivarius, Massimo Dutti, Pierre Cardin, Oysho, Mango, LC Waikiki, Reserved, Cropp, House, Sinsay, CCC, Intertop, Colin's, Timberland, Lacoste, Pandora, Brocard, Wójcik, Intimissimi, Women'secret, Budynok Igrashok, Igroland children entertainment, Sushiya, McDonald's and others.

The mall is owned by Dutch company Multi Corporation.

References

External links

See also 
 King Cross Leopolis — another shopping mall in Lviv.

Shopping malls in Lviv
Shopping malls established in 2015